Statistics of the Scottish Football League in season 1920–21. The competition was won by Rangers by ten points over nearest rival Celtic.

League table

Results

See also
1920–21 in Scottish football

References
 

 
Scottish Football League seasons